Tower Island is an Antarctic island  long and  high. It  marks the north-east extent of Palmer Archipelago. Both islands are separated from the Davis Coast to the south by Orléans Strait, running northeast–southwest. The Pearl Rocks lie off the West Coast of Tower Island.

The island was named on 30 January 1820 by Edward Bransfield, Master, Royal Navy, who described it as a round island.

Named features 
A number of features on Tower Island have been charted and named by various Antarctic expeditions. The following description of features begins from the north and proceeds clockwise along the coast to the east.

East coast
The northernmost point of the island is called Cape Leguillou. It was charted by a French expedition under Captain Jules Dumont d'Urville, 1837–40, and named by him for Élie Le Guillou, a surgeon on the expedition corvette . The name has been consistently used since that time. Ploski Cove (‘Zaliv Ploski’ \'za-liv 'plo-ski\), named after the village of Ploski in Bulgaria, is located to the east of the cape. Traverso Point forms the coast's southeastern edge.

Harmanli Cove is a  cove on the eastern cove of Tower Island. The cove is named after the town of Harmanli in southeastern Bulgaria. To the south is Cape Dumoutier, the eastern tip of Tower Island. It was named by d'Urville's expedition for Pierre Dumoutier, a surgeon with the expedition. It is named for the settlement of Breste in northern Bulgaria. South of that is Castillo Point.

Condyle Point is the southeast point of the island. It was named by the UK Antarctic Place-Names Committee (UK-APC). The name is descriptive of the shape of this feature: a condyle is the rounded prominence at the end of a bone.

The southernmost point of the island is Peña Point.

West coast
Ustina Point ('Nos Ustina' \'nos 'us-ti-na\) is a rocky point on the island's west coast. The point is named after the settlement of Ustina in southern Bulgaria. It is situated 2.6 km northwest of Peña Point.

Closer to the north end of the island, Kranevo Point (‘Nos Kranevo’ \'nos 'kra-ne-vo\), named for the Bulgarian village of Kranevo, forms the south side of the entrance to Mindya Cove.

Coastal rock groups 
 Dumoulin Rocks
 Kendall Rocks
 Pearl Rocks

See also
 Composite Antarctic Gazetteer
 List of Antarctic and sub-Antarctic islands
 List of Antarctic islands south of 60° S
 Scientific Committee on Antarctic Research
 Territorial claims in Antarctica

References

External links 
 SCAR Composite Antarctic Gazetteer
 Trinity Peninsula. Scale 1:250000 topographic map No. 5697. Institut für Angewandte Geodäsie and British Antarctic Survey, 1996.

Islands of the Palmer Archipelago